ersguterjunge is a German hip hop label founded by German rapper Bushido in 2004. The label has released 49 albums, including 34 studio albums.

Albums

Studio albums

Collaborative albums

Extended plays

Compilation albums

Sampler albums

Live albums

Mixtapes

Demos

References

Hip hop discographies